Dawda Ngum (born 2 September 1990) is a Gambian professional footballer who plays as a midfielder for the Gambia national team.

Club career
Born in Banjul, Ngum has played for BK Olympic, Trelleborg, Höllviken, and Rosengård. He signed for Brønshøj in July 2018, and for Roskilde in July 2019. On 10 January 2020, it was confirmed that Ngum had left Roskilde. On 26 February 2020, he returned to Brønshøj.

International career 
Ngum made his international debut for Gambia in 2015.

References

1990 births
Living people
Gambian footballers
The Gambia international footballers
BK Olympic players
Trelleborgs FF players
Höllvikens GIF players
Brønshøj Boldklub players
FC Roskilde players
Danish 2nd Division players
Danish 1st Division players
Association football midfielders
2021 Africa Cup of Nations players
Gambian expatriate footballers
Gambian expatriate sportspeople in Sweden
Expatriate footballers in Sweden
Gambian expatriate sportspeople in Denmark
Expatriate men's footballers in Denmark